Ranesh Perera (born 11 October 1985) is a Sri Lankan cricketer. He made his Twenty20 debut on 17 August 2004, for Colts Cricket Club in the 2004 SLC Twenty20 Tournament. He made his first-class debut for Ragama Cricket Club in the 2005–06 Premier Trophy on 16 December 2005.

References

External links
 

1985 births
Living people
Sri Lankan cricketers
Badureliya Sports Club cricketers
Colts Cricket Club cricketers
Ragama Cricket Club cricketers
Sri Lanka Ports Authority Cricket Club cricketers
Cricketers from Colombo